Jerónimo Lagos Lisboa (1883–1958) was a Chilean poet.

He was born in San Javier de Loncomilla, Linares Province, Maule Region, Chile, in 1883. He was a president of the Chilean Writers Society. He was awarded several poetry prizes, among them the Municipality of Santiago Poetry Award for his works "Tiempo Ausente" (1937) and "La pequeña Lumbre" (1945). He died in 1958.

1883 births
1958 deaths
People from Linares Province
Chilean male poets
20th-century Chilean poets
20th-century Chilean male writers